Daniel Constantin may refer to:

Daniel Constantin (administrator) (born 1940), French civil servant
Daniel Constantin (politician) (born 1978), Romanian politician
 Constantin Daniel (historian and great Romanian orientalist, 1914–1987)